The Togo lidless skink (Panaspis togoensis) is a species of lidless skinks in the family Scincidae. The species is found in western Africa.

References

Panaspis
Reptiles described in 1902
Taxa named by Franz Werner